Haydaryan is an Iranian security force established in 2009 by Ayatollah Ali Khamenei as a small, elite militia dedicated to preserving the Islamic Republic's Supreme Leader.

External links
Iranian Ayatollah Creates 'Private' Militia, Arutz Sheva, August 18, 2009
Ayatollah Creates 'Private' Militia, Stratfor, August 17, 2009
Iran: The Supreme Leader's New Security Force, Stratfor website, August 17, 2009

References

Paramilitary organisations based in Iran
Military units and formations established in 2009